Johann Andreas Streicher (13 December 1761 in Stuttgart – 25 May 1833 in Vienna) was a German pianist, composer and piano maker. In 1793 he married Nannette Streicher (1769–1833), another piano maker and the daughter of Augsburg piano maker Johann Andreas Stein. In 1794 they moved to Vienna. From that time Streicher worked as a piano teacher and became increasingly known for his compositions. The Streicher piano-making business provided at least one fortepiano to Beethoven in his early years, of which the composer was fond, writing that it was "too good for me ... because it robs me of the freedom to produce my own tone".

Works
 (S. [Johann Andreas Streicher]): Schiller’s Flucht von Stuttgart und Aufenthalt in Mannheim von 1782 bis 1785. Stuttgart und Augsburg, Verlag der J[ohann]. G[eorg]. Cotta’schen Buchhandlung [Inhaber: Georg von Cotta], 1836. [Incomplete text of the biography without the final chapters.] 
 (Johann)Andreas Streichers Schiller-Biographie. Hrsg. von Herbert Kraft. (Mannheim, Wien, Zürich 1974) (Forschungen zur Geschichte Mannheims und der Pfalz, hrsg. von der Gesellschaft der Freunde Mannheims und der ehemaligen Kurpfalz. Mannheimer Altertumsverein von 1859, Neue Folge, 5). [First complete edition with a commentary based on the manuscripts.]
Zehn Choral-Vorspiele für Orgel (mit cantus firmus), op. 4

Notes

References 
 Lewis Lockwood. Beethoven: The Music and the Life. W. W. Norton & Company, 2005. .
 Herbert Meyer:  Schillers Flucht von Stuttgart und Aufenthalt in Mannheim von 1782 bis 1785. In  Selbstzeugnissen,  zeitgenössischen  Berichten  und Bildern dargestellt. Mannheim 1959 ([Joseph] Meyers Bild-Bändchen, N. F., 16/17).
 Dietrich Germann: Andreas Streicher und sein Schiller-Buch. Über den Nachlaß von Schillers Freund und Fluchtgefährten. In: Weimarer Beiträge 14 (1968), pp. 1051–1059.
 Kyoji Shimamura: [jap.] (Streichers Schiller-Studien.) In: Waseda Dai-gaku seiji kaizaigakubu. (Kyoyo sho-gaku kenkyu), Heft 51 (1976), pp. 15–29.
 SchillerZeit in Mannheim. (Zur Ausstellung SchillerZeit in Mannnheim, Reiss-Engelhorn-Museen Mannheim D 5, 17. September 2005 bis 29. Januar 2006. Inhaltliche Konzeption: Liselotte Homering, Stephanie Käthow. Redaktion: Luisa Reiblich, Liselotte Homering.) Hrsg. von Alfried Wieczorek und Liselotte Homering. Mainz am Rhein : von Zabern (2005) (Publikationen der Reiss-Engelhorn-Museen, Bd. 16), here pp. (43)–48 Uta Goebl-Streicher: „… den Sprung der Freiheit mit ihm zu wagen“: Andreas Streicher und Schiller; pp. (65)–73 Peter Ruf: Schiller in Oggersheim.
 Peter Ruf: Schiller in Oggersheim. Katalog zur Ausstellung im Schillerhaus Oggersheim. Ludwigshafen: Stadtmuseum Ludwigshafen 2005. – 23 pp., ill. 
 Christoph Öhm-Kühnle: „Er weiß jeden Ton singen zu lassen“. Der Musiker und Klavierbauer Johann Andreas Streicher (1761–1833) – kompositorisches Schaffen und kulturelles Wirken im biografischen Kontext. Quellen – Funktion – Analyse. (München : Strube Verlag GmbH 2011) (Quellen und Studien zur Musik in Baden-Württemberg, hrsg. von der Gesellschaft für Musikgeschichte in Baden-Württemberg e. V., Bd. 9; Strube Edition, 9144). Teilweise zugleich Phil. Diss. Tübingen 2008. – 279 pp., 26 ill. - . 
 Reinhard Breymayer, Astronomie, Kalenderstreit und Liebestheologie. Von Erhard Weigel und seinem Schüler Detlev Clüver über Friedrich Christoph Oetinger und Philipp Matthäus Hahn zu Friedrich Schiller, Johann Andreas Streicher, Franz Joseph Graf von Thun und Hohenstein, Mozart und Beethoven. Dußlingen : Nous-Verlag Thomas Leon Heck, 2016. - . Cf. pp. 3 sq. 6 sq. 10. 111. 132-169. 204-208. 211-214. 216. 217. 220-222. 225. 227; especially pp. 133-137: "Allgemeine Forschungsliteratur zu Johann Andreas Streicher" (many titles!); pp. 137: "Spezielle Forschungsliteratur zu Johann Andreas Streicher als Fluchthelfer Schillers".

German composers
German musical instrument makers
Piano makers
Austrian people of German descent
Musicians from Stuttgart
1761 births
1833 deaths